The Grand Heist (lit. "Gone With the Wind") is a 2012 South Korean historical comedy film about a gang of 11 thieves who try to steal ice blocks from the royal storage, Seobingo, during the last years of the Joseon era. It was released on August 8, 2012.

Plot
In the late 18th century of Joseon Dynasty (1392–1910), during the last years of King Yeongjo’s reign. Ice is a commodity more valuable than gold. Blocks of it are harvested from frozen rivers in winter, put in royal storage and distributed or sold throughout the year for general consumption. When corrupt officials conspire to form a monopoly and fix its price, a gang of 11 professionals is formed to stop the scheme — and to do that they must make all the royal ice blocks in five storage rooms disappear for a night.

Cast
Cha Tae-hyun – Lee Deok-mu, the intelligent bastard son of the minister of the right, the court's only clean official. The laid-back bookseller initially chases pretty girls and rare exotic books, but after his father is falsely accused of a crime by his political rival, Deok-mu becomes the leader of the heist gang.
Oh Ji-ho – Baek Dong-soo, a trained soldier and ousted chief guard of the royal ice storage
Min Hyo-rin – Baek Soo-ryun, a diver and Dong-soo's sister
Lee Chae-young – Seol-hwa, a spy-gisaeng
Sung Dong-il – Jang Soo-gyun, the chief financial backer of the gang
Ko Chang-seok – Seok-chang, a grave-digging specialist 
Shin Jung-geun – Dae-hyun, a near-deaf explosives maker
Kim Gil-dong – Cheol-joo
Chun Bo-geun – Jung-goon, the "idea bank"
Kim Hyang-gi – Nan-i, a rumor-spreader
Song Jong-ho – Jae-joon, a master of disguises
Nam Kyeong-eup – Jo Myung-soo, the minister of the left who wants to monopolize the ice in Seobingo
Kim Ku-taek – Jo Young-cheol
Oh Na-ra – Jo Myung-soo's concubine
Lee Moon-sik – Mr. Yang (cameo)
Song Joong-ki – older Jung-goon (cameo)

Reception
The film drew 4 million viewers in just 19 days after its release, becoming the seventh homegrown movie in Korea to achieve the feat in 2012. Its total admissions is at a little over 4.9 million.

The film ranked second and grossed  in its first week of release, and grossed a total of  domestically after five weeks of screening.

Awards and nominations
2012 Grand Bell Awards: Nominated, Best New Director – Kim Joo-ho
2013 Fantasporto Orient Express Awards: Best Film

References

External links
  
 The Grand Heist at Naver 
 
 
 

2012 films
2012 action comedy films
2010s crime comedy films
2010s heist films
South Korean action comedy films
South Korean historical comedy films
South Korean heist films
Films set in the 18th century
Films set in the Joseon dynasty
Films set in Seoul
Next Entertainment World films
2010s Korean-language films
2010s South Korean films